Presentation Graphic Stream (PGS) is a standard used to encode video subtitles on Blu-ray Discs.

References 

Blu-ray Disc
Subtitling